Basílica del Juramento de San Rafael (Basilica of the Oath to Saint Rafael) is a minor basilica in Córdoba, Spain. It stands on the site where it is believed that the Raphael the Archangel appeared to Father Roeles in 1578, vowing to guard the city. Financing to build the church occurred the late 18th century, with construction completed in 1806. It is a Bien de Interés Cultural monument.

Architecture and fittings
The structure combines a longitudinal space with a circular facade representing the latest neoclassical style of the city. The interior is divided by three naves with bent arches that are rest upon quadrangular pillars. The crossing is crowned with a barrel vault . On the main altar, a baldachin houses the titular image, which dates to 1735. There are also works of the painter and Cordoban biographer Antonio Cordoba Acisclus Palomino which date to the 18th century.

External links

 Page at Cordobapedia 
 Page at Turismo de Córdoba 

Roman Catholic churches completed in 1806
Religious organizations established in 1806
Pedro
Bien de Interés Cultural landmarks in the Province of Córdoba (Spain)
Basilica churches in Spain
19th-century Roman Catholic church buildings in Spain